Zimnitsa is the largest village of Straldzha Municipality in southeastern Bulgaria. Zimnitsa is an important railway junction.

History 

The first settlers came to the current location of the village in 1812 from a village called Karasarli which was to the north of nowadays Zimnitsa. They worked on the sheepfold of a local Ottoman lord (pasha), so the settlement was named "Kishlakoy" (turk.kishla-sheepfold; koy-village). The church was built in 1856 and saved the population during bandit attacks. In 1906 the village was renamed Zimnitsa.

Economy 

Agriculture remains the main occupation of the local people. Many of them, however, work in the closest towns - Straldzha and Yambol.

External links
 https://web.archive.org/web/20091029133429/http://yambol.government.bg:80/pics/straldzhaen.htm
 http://wikimapia.org/3437986/Zimnitsa-Airfield

Villages in Yambol Province